George Lillycrop (7 December 1886 – 1962) was a professional footballer who played as a centre forward for several English sides before and just after the First World War.

Club career
Lillycrop was born in Gosport, Hampshire. He started his career playing for teams in the North Eastern League before transferring to Barnsley some time before 1910. He played in both FA Cup finals that Barnsley reached in 1910 and 1912. In the first, Barnsley lost in the replay to Newcastle. In 1912, Lillycrop played a critical role in the qualifying rounds, scoring 6 goals, several in replays. The 1912 Final went again to a replay but Barnsley won, defeating West Bromwich Albion by one goal in extra time. Given his key role in the qualifying rounds he does not feature much in the match day reports.

In July 1913, he was transferred to Bolton Wanderers for £1,300. He played a total of 52 games, scoring 32 goals. Bolton reached the FA cup semi-finals in 1915 and were defeated by Sheffield United, captained by George Utley, his fellow wing half from Barnsley. After the war, he returned to the North East playing for South Shields.

Coaching career
After the end of his playing career he took up coaching. He worked for South Shields, Gateshead and Crewe Alexandra.

Honours
Barnsley
FA Cup: Runners Up   1910
FA Cup: Winners   1912

References

English footballers
Barnsley F.C. players
Bolton Wanderers F.C. players
South Shields F.C. (1889) players
North Shields F.C. players
Crewe Alexandra F.C. managers
People from Gosport
Year of death missing
English Football League managers
1886 births
Association football forwards
English football managers
FA Cup Final players